The Governor of Maharashtra is the ceremonial head of the state of Maharashtra. The Constitution of India confers the executive powers of the state to the governor, however the de facto executive powers lie with the Council of Ministers.

Ramesh Bais is the current governor of Maharashtra since February 13, 2023.

Powers and duties 
The governor formally appoints many of the state officials, including the advocate general of Bombay, the Lokayukta and Upa Lokayukta, the state election commissioner, the chairman and members of the Maharashtra Administrative Tribunal, the chairman and members of the Mahtrarashtra State Human Rights Commission, the chairman and members of the Maharashtra Public Service Commission (MPSC), the chairmen and members of the three development boards, the sheriff of Bombay, and the state chief information commissioner.

Governors of Maharashtra
This is a list of governors of Maharashtra:

Seen also
First Lady of Maharashtra
List of chief ministers of Maharashtra
Deputy Chief Minister of Maharashtra
List of Chairman of the Maharashtra Legislative Council

List of speakers of the Maharashtra Legislative Assembly 

List of Deputy Speakers of the Maharashtra Legislative Assembly

List of Leader of the House of the Maharashtra Legislative Assembly

List of Leaders of the House of the Maharashtra Legislative Council

 List of Deputy Leader of the House of the Maharashtra Legislative Assembly

List of Leader of the Opposition of the Maharashtra Legislative Assembly

List of Leader of the Opposition of the Maharashtra Legislative Council

Governors of India

References

Maharashtra
 
Governors